Apocalypse Oz is a 2006 short film. It is based on the novels Heart of Darkness (1899) by Joseph Conrad and The Wonderful Wizard of Oz (1900) by L. Frank Baum. The script is a hybrid of the two classic films Apocalypse Now (1979) and The Wizard of Oz (1939), and uses only dialogue from these films.

Plot
Dorothy Willard, an Amerasian product of the Vietnam War, is tired of living with her abusive foster parents in Kansas. Dorothy decides that "there's no horror like home" and accepts a dream mission that takes her deep into the desert to hunt down and "terminate with extreme prejudice" an insane, renegade US Army colonel - codenamed 'The Wizard'.

Cast
 M. C. Gainey as Kurtz, "The Wizard"
 Alexandra Gizela as Dorothy Willard
 Billy Briggs as Hunk, a stoner hitchhiker and version of The Scarecrow
 Brian Poth as Doorman
 Kevin Glikman as Kilgore, a cop and a version of the Wicked Witch
 Tammy Garrett as Giang
 Amy Lyndon as Em
 Don Paul as Henry

Reception
The film received positive reviews. Film Threat's review said “Apocalypse Oz” had the ability to ruin it from the very beginning but Telford's direction, convincing performances and an original concept make this worth watching." Quiet Earth described it as a "kinetic punk-rock gem of a film... something entirely new [that] attempts to explore new ways of telling stories."

External links
 
 Film Threat Review
 Quiet Earth Review

2006 films
2006 short films
2000s adventure drama films
Films based on The Wizard of Oz
Films based on multiple works
American coming-of-age films
American short films
American independent films
Apocalypse Now
The Wizard of Oz (1939 film)
American black-and-white films
Films based on works by Joseph Conrad
2006 drama films
2000s American films